The Oh in Ohio is a 2006 American comedy film directed by Billy Kent and starring Parker Posey, Paul Rudd, Mischa Barton and Danny DeVito. The picture was screened at several US film festivals from March to May 2006 and was released theatrically by Cyan Pictures on July 14, 2006.  Set in Cleveland, much of the film was shot on location at well-known Cleveland area landmarks such as Coventry Village and Case Western Reserve University.

Plot
Frustrated with the fact that he cannot give his wife Priscilla (Parker Posey) an orgasm, Jack (Paul Rudd) moves out of the house and starts a relationship with Kristen (Mischa Barton), his student.  Unfulfilled, Priscilla forms an unlikely partnership with Wayne (Danny DeVito), a businessman more than twice her age.

Cast
 Parker Posey as Priscilla Chase
 Paul Rudd as Jack Chase
 Danny DeVito as Wayne Sianidis
 Mischa Barton as Kristen Taylor
 Miranda Bailey as Sherri
 Keith David as Coach Popovich
 Liza Minnelli as Alyssa Donahue
 Heather Graham as Justine
 Tim Russ as Douglas
 Adam Nelson as Kid at Vending Machine

Reception
The film was a commercial failure, earning back less than 10% of its $5 million budget at the box office. Lou Lumenick of the New York Post wrote, "Despite its seemingly sure-fire premise and cast of veteran comedians, this movie just lies there without a single laugh." Dan Callahan of Slant gave the film 0 stars out of 4, calling it an "implausible, weirdly depressed comedy", adding "there isn't one laugh in it". Entertainment Weekly was more favorable, giving the film a 'B−', with Owen Gleiberman describing it as "a silly, amusing trifle". And Joe Leydon of Variety praised it in his upbeat review as an "amusing indie comedy [that] blithely blurs the line between risqué and raunchy, often to hilarious effect."

See also
 List of Ambush Entertainment Films

References

External links
 
 

2006 films
2006 romantic comedy films
American independent films
American sex comedy films
2000s English-language films
Films set in Cleveland
Films shot in Cleveland
2000s sex comedy films
2006 independent films
2000s American films